The Queen Mary is an upcoming British horror film directed by Gary Shore and starring Alice Eve and Joel Fry.

Premise
Three interconnected stories cover the violent disintegration of two families onboard the RMS Queen Mary in 1938 and the present day.

Cast
 Alice Eve
 Joel Fry

Production
The Queen Mary was written by Stephen Oliver and Tom Vaughan with revisions by Gary Shore. It is a British co-production between Imagination Design Works, Rocket Science, and White Horse Pictures. Brett Tomberlin developed the feature film, first announced in 2013, and produced it alongside Thorsten Schumacher, Lars Sylvest, Nigel Sinclair, and Nicholas Ferrall. In January 2019, Shore was announced to direct. By March 2021, it was revealed The Queen Mary would serve as the first in a trilogy of horror films about the RMS Queen Mary, a retired ocean liner that remains permanently moored in Long Beach, California. In October 2021, filming began in a studio developed by ARRI and Creative Technologies. Filming took place onboard the RMS Queen Mary in November.

References

External links
 

British horror films
Films directed by Gary Shore
Films set in 1938
Films set on ships
Films shot in London
Films shot in Los Angeles County, California
Upcoming English-language films